American lynx may refer to:

 American Lynx cat, an experimental breed of short-haired, short-tailed domestic cat; as of 2017 it is recognized only by the Rare & Exotic Feline Registry
 Genus Lynx wild cats in the Americas:
 Canada lynx (Lynx canadensis), a North American wild cat, ranging from the northern United States, through Canada, to Alaska
 Bobcat (Lynx rufus), a North American wild cat, ranging from northern Mexico to southern Canada